BodyRock Sport is a manufacturer sports bras and women's activewear. The bras are described as "blinged-out", with Swarovski crystals or studs, and conveniences such as zippered compartments and built-in pockets for digital audio players.

Charities
BodyRock Sport supports the following charities: 
New York Road Runners' Team for Kids
Girls' LEAP (Lifetime Empowerment & Awareness Program)
American Cancer Society
The Dougy Center
LA's BEST: After School Enrichment
International Princess Project

See also

Sportswear (activewear)

References

External links
Official site

Manufacturing companies based in New York City
Brassieres
Sportswear